The cyclists Katrin Schultheis (born 25 January 1984 in Mainz) and Sandra Sprinkmeier (born 31 May 1984 in Mainz) are a team of artistic cyclists. They are reigning world champions since November 2007.

They are members of RV Mainz-Ebersheim.

Successes 

2013

 new world-record 165.12 points, first cyclists over 165 points.

2012
  world-champions in Aschaffenburg
  German champions
 winners of the German-Masters-Series

2011
 world-champions in Kagoshima
 winners of the German-Masters-Series
 new world-record 160.43 points, first cyclists over 160 points.

2010
 vice-world-champions in Stuttgart
 winners of the German-Masters-Series
 new world-record 156.33 points

2009
 world-champions in Tavira (Portugal)
 UCI-Ranking-winners
  German champions
 new world-record 150.75 points 

2008
  world-champions in Dornbirn (Austria)
 UCI-Ranking-winners
 winners of the German-Masters-Series
2007
  world-champions in Winterthur (Switzerland)
 new world-record 316.39 points
 UCI-Ranking-winners
 winners of the German-Masters-Series

References

External links 
Official Homepage

German female cyclists
Living people
Sportspeople from Mainz
1984 births
Cyclists from Rhineland-Palatinate
Sports duos